Trevor King (born 28 May 1960) is a British biathlete. He competed at the 1984 Winter Olympics and the 1988 Winter Olympics.

References

1960 births
Living people
British male biathletes
Olympic biathletes of Great Britain
Biathletes at the 1984 Winter Olympics
Biathletes at the 1988 Winter Olympics
Sportspeople from Southampton